On the International Space Station (ISS), extravehicular activities are major events in the building and maintaining of the orbital laboratory, and are performed to install new components, re-wire systems, modules, and equipment, and to monitor, install, and retrieve scientific experiments.

Due to the complexity of building a station in space, space agencies train astronauts extensively, preparing them to encounter surprises during spacewalks, teaching them how to assemble special tools and equipment, and carefully coordinating every activity during spacewalks. From 1998 to 2005, thirty-seven Space Shuttle missions were scheduled to assemble, outfit and begin experiments and research aboard the station.

The initial spacewalk to begin the assembly of the International Space Station was held on 7 December 1998, following the launch of the first section of the station, Zarya, from Baikonur Cosmodrome, Kazakhstan, on 20 November 1998. The spacewalk attached the U.S.-built Unity node to Zarya. The longest spacewalk was performed on 11 March 2001, when STS-102 crew members Susan J. Helms and James S. Voss conducted a full spacewalk, and then returned to the airlock, but remained in their suits ready to exit the airlock again in case the robotics operations ran into problems. The total time for that spacewalk was eight hours and fifty-six minutes.

As of 2 December 2021, there have been 245 spacewalks devoted to assembly and maintenance of the International Space Station totaling 1548 hours and 26 minutes. Thirty-seven of those spacewalks were performed from a shuttle, ninety-three from the Quest Joint Airlock, thirty-two from the Pirs docking compartment, and two from the transfer compartment at the forward end of the Zvezda service module.

*denotes spacewalks performed from the Pirs docking compartment in Russian Orlan suits.
^denotes spacewalks performed from the Poisk module in Russian Orlan suits.
†denotes spacewalks performed from the visiting Space Shuttle's airlock.
‡denotes the one EVA and one IVA performed from the transfer compartment at the forward end of the Zvezda Service Module.
All other spacewalks were performed from the Quest airlock.
ISS Expedition spacewalks are separated from shuttle spacewalks by a separator.

1998–1999

2000

2001

2002

2003

2004

2005

2006

2007

2008

2009

2010

2011

2012

2013

2014

2015

2016

2017

2018

2019

2020

2021

2022

2023

Planned 

*denotes spacewalks performed from the Pirs docking compartment in Russian Orlan suits.
^denotes spacewalks performed from the Poisk module in Russian Orlan suits.
†denotes spacewalks performed from the visiting space shuttle's airlock.
‡denotes the one EVA and one IVA performed from the transfer compartment at the forward end of the Zvezda Service Module.
All other spacewalks were performed from the Quest airlock.
ISS Expedition spacewalks are separated from shuttle spacewalks by a separator.

Gallery

See also
List of spacewalks and moonwalks
List of cumulative spacewalk records

References

External links
NASA – EVA FAQ
NASA – International Space Station
International Space Station Daily reports
NASA Office of Space Operations – EVA Statistics page (may not be up to date)

ISS spacewalks
Human spaceflight